Short-barreled rifle broadly refers to any rifle with an unusually short barrel. The term carbine describes a production rifle with a reduced barrel length for easier handling in confined spaces. Concern about concealment for illegal purposes has encouraged regulations specifying minimum barrel lengths and overall lengths.

Measurement method
Barrel length is measured from the end of the muzzle to the front of the breechface, typically by inserting a measuring rod into the barrel. Barrel length may partially comprise a permanently attached muzzle accessory (such as a recoil compensator or flash suppressor). Overall length is measured between the extreme ends of the gun, along a centerline which passes through the middle of the barrel. For rifles fitted with folding or telescoping stocks (such as U.S. Carbine M1A1), US Federal guidelines state that measurement is performed with the stock unfolded as intended for use as a rifle. Some states – such as California and Michigan – measure overall length with the stock folded.

Production
In the United States, each of these processes must legally be accompanied by ATF registration.

Many older handguns originally designed with shoulder stocks, such as broomhandle Mausers, Lugers, Browning Hi-Power and Inglis as well as many lever action Winchesters with 14 to 15.5 inch barrels, are considered relics instead of NFA restricted, and not regulated by federal SBR rules; however, they may still be subject to local laws. The ATF maintains a list of Curio & Relic of gun models and serial number ranges. While they are not considered NFA devices under the 1934 National Firearms Act, most are regulated by the Gun Control Act of 1968. Those made before 1899 and exempt in the ATF Curio and Relic list, are also exempt from the GCA.

Pistol brace 
When used as designed, a pistol brace should only support the firearm by the shooter's forearm. According to the ATF, putting the pistol brace against one's shoulder does not constitute a redesign of the brace. It is based upon the item's manufacturer design and intent. This means registration is not required if a shooter intends to use a brace as a stock. Other jurisdictions, such as Canada, do not tend to have such rules.

Legislative history
American, British, and Canadian lawmakers tightened laws on concealable weapons in the 1930s.

United States of America
The United States' regulation of short-barreled rifles was the result of the National Firearms Act of 1934 which also imposed restrictions on short barreled shotguns, suppressors and machine guns.  The reasoning for the restrictions on short-barrelled rifles and shotguns was not because they are more dangerous, but rather to prevent circumventing of the act's ban on handguns.  However, the handgun ban was removed from the act prior to it being passed.
In the United States, an SBR is an item regulated by the Bureau of Alcohol, Tobacco, Firearms and Explosives (ATF) as a Title II weapon. In the absence of local laws prohibiting ownership, American civilians may own an SBR provided it is registered with the ATF, and a $200 tax is paid prior to taking possession of or creating the firearm.
It is a federal felony to possess an SBR in the USA unless it is registered with the ATF to the person who possesses it. Class 2 manufacturers, Class 3 dealers, and government agencies can transfer these firearms, tax exempt. The individual buyer or owner is responsible for paying the $200 tax when purchasing, manufacturing, or transferring an SBR. They must also notify the ATF when transporting it across state lines.

As a result of the Supreme Court decision in United States v. Thompson/Center Arms Company, 504 U.S. 505 (1992), it is not illegal to possess a "kit" allowing a handgun to be fitted with a buttstock and with barrels both under and over the 16 inch minimum for a rifle, so long as the firearm is only assembled into legal (handgun with no buttstock, rifle with buttstock and 16 inch or longer barrel) configurations. Assembling the firearm into an NFA-regulated configuration (rifle with buttstock but barrel shorter than 16 inches) would be a violation of the National Firearms Act.

Canada

Possessing a restricted firearm requires additional licensing beyond that required for non-restricted firearms.

United Kingdom

All such weapons are considered small firearrms and are covered in general prohibition by s5 of the Firearms Act 1968.

Australia

See also
Overview of gun laws by nation
Title II weapons

References

External links
ATF: National Firearms Act (NFA) — Short Barreled Rifles and Shotguns

Rifles